The Misanthrope (German: Der Menschenfeind) is a 1923 German silent film directed by Rudolf Walther-Fein and starring Werner Krauss, Bernd Aldor and Reinhold Schünzel.

Cast
 Werner Krauss 
 Bernd Aldor
 Reinhold Schünzel 
 Dagny Servaes 
 Ilka Grüning 
 Lili Alexandra 
 Eduard von Winterstein 
 Leopold von Ledebur 
 Erwin Biswanger 
 Wilhelm Diegelmann 
 Margarete Kupfer

References

Bibliography
 Grange, William. Cultural Chronicle of the Weimar Republic. Scarecrow Press, 2008.

External links

1923 films
Films of the Weimar Republic
Films directed by Rudolf Walther-Fein
German silent feature films
German black-and-white films